Patrik Svitana (born 10 July 1988) is a Slovak professional ice hockey player who is currently playing for the HK Poprad in the Slovak Extraliga.

Career
He formerly played in the Polska Hokej Liga with the KS Cracovia.

Career statistics

Regular season and playoffs
Bold indicates led league

International

References

External links

 

1988 births
Living people
Sportspeople from Poprad
Slovak ice hockey right wingers
HK Poprad players
MHK Kežmarok players
HC Košice players
Yertis Pavlodar players
MKS Cracovia (ice hockey) players
Expatriate ice hockey players in Kazakhstan
Expatriate ice hockey players in Poland
Slovak expatriate ice hockey people
Slovak expatriate sportspeople in Kazakhstan
Slovak expatriate sportspeople in Poland